Oussama Jaziri (born 6 November 1992) is a Tunisian handball player for Al Ahly and the Tunisian national team.

He represented Tunisia at the 2019 World Men's Handball Championship.

References

1992 births
Living people
Tunisian male handball players
Mediterranean Games competitors for Tunisia
Competitors at the 2022 Mediterranean Games
20th-century Tunisian people
21st-century Tunisian people